The Irregular at Magic High School is an anime adaptation of a light novel series written by Tsutomu Satō. The 26-episode series aired from April 6, 2014 to September 28, 2014. It is directed by Manabu Ono and animated by Madhouse.

The series uses four pieces of theme music: two opening themes and two ending themes. The first opening theme is "Rising Hope" by LiSA while the first ending theme is "Millenario." by Elisa. The second opening theme is "Grilleto" by Garnidelia while the second ending theme is "Mirror" by Rei Yasuda. 



Episode list

References

2014 Japanese television seasons
The Irregular at Magic High School episode lists